The 2006 Africa Cup was the seventh edition of highest level rugby union tournament in Africa. In this edition, the tournament expanded from nine nations to twelve leading to a change in the format of the tournament which now includes four pools of three teams. Results from Pool 1 & 2 also counted for the 2007 Rugby World Cup qualifying.

Division 1 (Africa Cup)

Pool Stage
Pool 1 & 2 were played on home and away basis as they also counted for Round 2 of 2007 Rugby World Cup qualifying.
Pool winners qualify for the semi-finals.

Pool 1

Pool 2

Pool 3

Pool 4

Knockout stage

Semi-finals
Second semi-final on home and away because of the 2007 Rugby World Cup qualifying.

South Africa qualified to final.

Namibia qualified to final e to 2007 Rugby World Cup.

Final

Division 2

Notes and references 

2006
2006 rugby union tournaments for national teams
2006 in African rugby union